Enough is Enough is a British political campaign. The campaign seeks to pressure businesses and the United Kingdom Government into subsidising energy costs and increasing wages. The campaign claims it is a left-wing policy platform backed by politicians, commentators and trade unions. The organisation's manifesto calls for 

 A real pay rise
 A cut in energy bills
 An end to food poverty
 'Decent' homes for all
 Higher tax for the wealthy
 Nationalisation of Certain Industries. 

Mick Lynch, the National Union of Rail, Maritime and Transport Workers general is one of the organisation's leaders.

At their Autumn Conference in 2022, The Green Party of England and Wales voted to affiliate themselves with the Enough is Enough campaign.

References

Political advocacy groups in the United Kingdom